Somatidia australiae is a species of beetle in the family Cerambycidae. It was described by Carter in 1926. It is known from Australia.

References

australiae
Beetles described in 1926